The Western Region of Uganda is one of four regions in the country of Uganda.

Districts 

As of 2010, the Western Region contained 26 districts:

Geography

The Western Region borders with the Democratic Republic of Congo in the west and the Northern tip of Rwanda as well as Tansania in the South.

It is home to the Songora people.

External links 
 Google Map of the Western Region of Uganda

References 

 
Regions of Uganda